The 20th Canadian Film Awards were held on October 4, 1968 to honour achievements in Canadian film. The ceremony was hosted by Bill Walker and Louise Marleau.

The 1968 awards represented the first time that the awards were presented by an organization independently incorporated as the Canadian Film Awards, with its own board of directors, rather than by the consortium of the Canadian Association of Adult Education, the Canadian Foundation and the Canadian Film Institute. It was also the first time that awards were presented in many of the craft categories, such as for actors and actresses, and it was the last year in which awards were presented for amateur films.

Winners

Films
Film of the Year: A Place to Stand - TDF Productions, Christopher Chapman producer and director
Feature Film: The Ernie Game - National Film Board of Canada, Gordon Burwash producer, Don Owen director
Film Under 30 Minutes: Ça n'est pas le temps des romans (This Is No Time for Romance) - National Film Board of Canada,Fernand Dansereau director
Film Over 30 Minutes: Do Not Fold, Staple, Spindle or Mutilate - National Film Board of Canada, John Howe director
Documentary Under 30 Minutes: Avec tambours et trompettes (With Drums and Trumpets) - National Film Board of Canada, Robert Forget producer, Marcel Carrière director
Documentary Over 30 Minutes: Never a Backward Step - National Film Board of Canada, Guy Glover producer, Donald Brittain, Arthur Hammond and John Spotton directors
Animated: Not awarded
Honorable Mention: Un enfant... Un pays (A Child in His Country) - National Film Board of Canada, Jacques Bobet producer, Pierre Moretti director
Travel and Recreation: Countdown to a Gold Medal - Canadian Broadcasting Corporation, Denis Hargrave producer and director
Public Relations: Carstairs, Tell the People - Crawley Films, F.R. Crawley and Seaton Findlay producers, Seaton Findlay director
Sales Promotion: Life Is Worth the Living - Chetwynd Films - Gerald S. Kedley producer
Amateur: Il était une plume — Robert Lachapelle director

Technical Development and Innovation Awards
John D. Lowry and Canadian Westinghouse Company - "for the Wescam stabilized camera platform".
Barry D. Gordon and Don Weed of Film Effects - "for dynamic frame and multi-image in A Place to Stand.
Gerald Graham and the NFB's Technical Services Branch - "for In the Labyrinth".
Honourable Mention: Westminster Films - "for Expo 67 Bell Telephone production".

John Drainie Awards
Esse Ljungh - Stage (series), CBC Radio
W.O. Mitchell, author - Jake and the Kid, CBC Radio
Tommy Tweed - actor, writer and historian
Jean Murray - Winnipeg actress (posthumous)

Feature Film Craft Awards
Performance by a Lead Actor: Gerard Parkes - Isabel (Quest Film Productions)
Performance by a Lead Actress: Geneviève Bujold - Isabel (Quest Film Productions)
Black-and-White Cinematography: Bernard Gosselin - Le règne du jour (The Times That Are) (NFB)
Colour Cinematography: Georges Dufaux - Isabel (Quest Film Productions)
Direction: Don Owen - The Ernie Game (NFB)
Film Editing: George Appleby - Isabel (Quest Film Productions)
Overall Sound: Serge Beauchemin and Alain Dostie - Le règne du jour (The Times That Are) (NFB)

Non-Feature Craft Awards
Colour Cinematography: Denis Gillson - Waiting for Caroline (NFB)
Sound Editing: Ken Heeley-Ray - A Place to Stand (TDF Productions)
Music Score: Louis Applebaum - Athabasca
Screenplay: Phillip Hersch - Wojeck: Swing Low Sweet Chariot (CBC)
Non-Dramatic Script: Hugh Kemp, The Secret Years of El Dorado (CBC)
Sound Recording: Ron Alexander and Roger Lamoureux, Do Not Fold, Staple, Spindle or Mutilate (NFB)

Special Award 
Pas de deux - National Film Board of Canada, Norman McLaren "for outstanding artistic achievement".

References

Canadian
Canadian Film Awards (1949–1978)
1968 in Canada